Xanthoconalia is a genus of beetles in the family Mordellidae, containing the following species:

Xanthoconalia patrizii Franciscolo, 1942
Xanthoconalia timossii Franciscolo, 1942

References

Mordellidae